White City is a district of London, England, in the northern part of Shepherd's Bush in the London Borough of Hammersmith and Fulham, 5 miles (8 km) west-northwest of Charing Cross. White City is home to Television Centre (previously the BBC Television Centre), White City Place, Westfield London and Queens Park Rangers football club's ground Loftus Road.

History

20th century

Origins

The area now called White City was level arable farmland until 1908, when it was used as the site of the Franco-British Exhibition and the 1908 Summer Olympics. In 1909 the exhibition site hosted the Imperial International Exhibition and in 1910, the Japan–British Exhibition. The final two exhibitions to be held there were the Latin-British Exhibition (1912) and the Anglo-American Exhibition (1914), which was brought to a premature end by the outbreak of the First World War. During this period it was known as the Great White City due to the white marble cladding used on the exhibition pavilions, and hence gave its name to this part of Shepherd's Bush. Apartments blocks built for the lower income were constructed in the 1930s.

White City Stadium
The White City Stadium in the north of the area, known as the Great Stadium and seating 66,000, was officially opened by King Edward VII on 27 April 1908 for the Olympics. After the Olympics, it continued to be used for athletics until 1914, and was later turned into a greyhound racing track, although it was also used for short periods by Queens Park Rangers football club, and for other sports. In 1931, a 440-yard running track was installed for the Amateur Athletic Association Championships, held there from 1932 to 1970. It also hosted the match between Uruguay and France during the 1966 World Cup.

In 1934, American rodeo promoter Tex Austin staged the World's Championship Rodeo at White City Stadium. Champion cowboys and cowgirls from Canada and the United States participated including Pete Knight, Weldon Bascom, Clark Lund, Ted Elder and Vera McGinnis. The world's most famous rodeo bucking horse, Midnight, was brought out of retirement for one last rodeo. The month-long rodeo was held from 9 June to 6 July with ten shows per week. British Pathe filmed some of the events.

The Stadium was home to the White City Rebels Speedway team, part of the inaugural British League in 1929 and from 1976 to 1978. Speedway was run first in 1928 and occasional meetings were run from 1953 to 1958, 1961 and 1979 to 1983.

The stadium was demolished in 1985 to make way for the BBC White City building. Today, the 1908 Olympics are commemorated with a list of athletes inscribed on the side of the BBC Broadcast Centre Building, and the athletics finish line is marked in the paving outside the building.

The Marathon from these London Olympics played an important part in the development of the modern marathon race. In the early years of competitive international sport, the long-distance marathon race did not have a standard set distance. In 1921 this was adopted as the standard distance.

White City Estate
To house the growing population of Shepherd's Bush, a five-storey housing estate was built before the Second World War in the late 1930s and after the Second World War, which also took the name of the White City. Streets were named after countries that had featured in the exhibitions.

The estate is served by an Anglican church, St Michael and St George (1955) located on Commonwealth Avenue.

BBC White City
BBC White City was built in 1990 at the former site of the White City Stadium.

21st century
In 2001, BBC Television Centre was damaged by a car bomb attack by the Real IRA. The bomb went off on Wood Lane, in front of the Television Centre news building. In 2006, a group of Arab terrorists tried to blow up the Westfield London but they were stopped by police. They wanted the bombing to be around the same day as that of the 2005 London attacks anniversary.

On 30 October 2008, Westfield shopping centre was opened.

Westfield Group (with Hausinvest Europa) has built a new shopping centre, bounded by the West Cross Route (A3220, formerly the M41 motorway), the Westway (A40) and Wood Lane (A219). This centre has been branded "Westfield London".

In 2007, it was announced that the BBC would sell its landmark Television Centre as part of a cost-cutting programme.

In 2008 English Heritage announced its recommendation to list parts of TV centre as an excellent example of 20th-century architecture.

Following the sale of BBC Television Centre, it was redeveloped by Stanhope who said in April 2014 that the new Television Centre development would "pay homage to the original use of the building" and retain original features of the buildings including the "doughnut", atomic dot wall and Helios statue. The new Television Centre will be opened up to the public and will offer entertainment and leisure facilities, including a new branch of members' club Soho House, offices aimed at the creative sector and approximately 1,000 new homes, together with pedestrian access through the site providing connectivity with the local area, including Hammersmith Park. BBC Studioworks (formerly BBC S&PP) moved back to Television Centre in 2017 to operate Studios 1, 2 and 3. BBC Worldwide moved into office space in the Stage 6 building following extensive refurbishment in 2015.

White City has become a key regeneration area within Central London. A partnership between White City Living by St James, Westfield London, Stanhope and Imperial College London, has created a vision for the future of White City area.

The regeneration project will provide 5,000+ new homes, 2 million sq ft of commercial office space, 30 acres of public space, 19,000 jobs and Westfield London will become the largest shopping centre in Western Europe, with over 400 stores, a cinema, and restaurants.

Transport
Two stations were built to serve the centre close to the sites of closed former London Underground stations:
Wood Lane on the Circle line and the Hammersmith & City line, located to provide a walking distance connection with the Central line station at White City.
Shepherd's Bush on the West London line, to the east of the site adjacent to the Holland Park roundabout and served by London Overground trains. It is also a short walking distance from Shepherd's Bush tube station served by the Central line.

Education

Imperial College London purchased the BBC Woodlands site for 28 million pounds in 2009 and demolished it the following year. Sections of this second major campus started opening in most notably an "innovation hub" for the college, including research facilities and commercialisation space, as well as postgraduate accommodation. The chemistry department moved much of its research to the new Molecular Sciences Research Hub on the campus in 2018, with further departments and industry partners moving to the campus and surrounding area over the coming years. The campus is also home to the Invention Rooms, a college hackerspace and community outreach centre.

Schools in the area include Ark Burlington Danes Academy and Phoenix Academy

Nearest places 

 Wormwood Scrubs
 Notting Hill
 Kensal Green
 Bayswater
 Harlesden
 North Kensington

Acton
West Kensington
Shepherd's Bush

Nearest tube stations 

 East Acton
 Goldhawk Road
 Latimer Road
 Shepherd's Bush Market
 Shepherd's Bush
 White City
 Wood Lane

Nearest railway stations 
 Shepherd's Bush

Popular culture
 
 Pete Townshend, a former resident of Shepherd's Bush, released a solo album entitled White City: A Novel in November 1985 on Atco. The title refers to a story which accompanies the album and which takes place in the London area of White City. A related film was also produced.
 North of the Westfield shopping centre itself, the grade II listed Dimco Buildings (1898), now refurbished as a bus depot were used as the location for the ‘Acme Factory’ in the 1988 film Who Framed Roger Rabbit.
 Journalist Daisy Waugh lives in White City.

See also
History of Shepherd's Bush

Gallery

References

External links 

 Official Site of White City Development
 Details of new transport infrastructure

 
Areas of London
Districts of the London Borough of Hammersmith and Fulham
World's fair sites in England
History of the London Borough of Hammersmith and Fulham
Buildings and structures in the London Borough of Hammersmith and Fulham
Sport in Hammersmith and Fulham